The Rulers of India was a biographical book series edited by William Wilson Hunter and published from the Clarendon Press, Oxford. Hunter himself contributed the volumes on Dalhousie (1890) and Mayo (1891) to the series.

Background
William Hunter retired from his long career as a member of the Indian Civil Service in March 1887 and settled in Oxford, England. On 13 March 1889 Philip Lyttelton Gell, then Secretary to the Delegates of the Clarendon Press, wrote to Hunter about 

Gell arranged the publication of the series by June 1889; with Hunter receiving £75 for each volume, and the author £25. Financial constraints forced the series to end at 28 volumes in spite of Hunter's disappointment about the same.

Volumes

References

Bibliography

External links

Book series introduced in 1889
Multi-volume biographies
Biographies about royalty
Biographies about politicians
Indian biographies
Oxford University Press books